better known by her ring name Misae Genki is a Japanese retired professional wrestler best known for her tenure with the Japanese promotions NEO Japan Ladies Pro-Wrestling, All Japan Women's Pro-Wrestling and JWP Joshi Puroresu.

Professional wrestling career

Independent circuit (1996–2008)
Watanabe is known for competing in various promotions from the Japanese independent scene. She competed in two of the earliest events promoted by Ice Ribbon, both held on September 9, 2006, respective the Ice Ribbon The Fifth Ice Ribbon Part 2 and 3, where she first teamed up with Cherry to defeat Aoi Kizuki and Kaori Yoneyama, and secondly with Ayako Sato to defeat Kizuki and Ray. At Oz Academy Wizard on April 1, 2007, she teamed up with Yuki Miyazaki in a losing effort against Chikayo Nagashima and Dynamite Kansai. She also took part in independent events such as Jaguar Yokota's 30th Anniversary Convention from March 11, 2007, where she competed in a 32-person battle royal won by Devil Masami and also involving popular wrestlers from the 1980s and 1990s like Akino, Carlos Amano, Gami, Mayumi Ozaki, Sachie Abe, Toshie Uematsu, Yumiko Hotta and many others.

JWP Joshi Puroresu (1998–2008)
Watanabe also competed in JWP. Her most notable works mainly focused on title matches, such as the one from JWP Climax 2008 on December 28, where she teamed up with Keiko Aono to unsuccessfully challenge Ran Yu-Yu and Toshie Uematsu for both the JWP Tag Team Championship and the Daily Sports Women's Tag Team Championship.

All Japan Women's Pro-Wrestling (1994–2005)
Watanabe made her professional wrestling debut in All Japan Women's Pro-Wrestling at AJW Japan Grand Prix '94 on August 28, 1994, where she teamed up with Kumiko Maekawa and faced Rie Tamada and Yoko Takahashi.

During her eleven-year tenure with the promotion, Watanabe compted in various of the promotion's signarute events. As for the Tag League the Best, she made her first appearance at the 2001 edition where she teamed up with Kumiko Maekawa and scored a total of five points after going against the teams of Manami Toyota and Yumiko Hotta, Kaoru Ito and Momoe Nakanishi, Las Cachorras Orientales (Etsuko Mita and Mima Shimoda), Kiss no Sekai (Kayo Noumi and Miho Wakizawa) and Nanae Takahashi and Tomoko Watanabe. At the 2002 edition she teamed up with Maekawa again, scoring a total of seven points after competing against Kiss no Sekai (Kayo Noumi and Momoe Nakanishi), Takako Inoue and Tomoko Watanabe, Las Cachorras Orientales (Etsuko Mita and Mima Shimoda), Fang Suzuki and Nanae Takahashi, Mariko Yoshida and Yumiko Hotta, Megumi Yabushita and Sumie Sakai, and Mika Nishio and Miyuki Fujii.

Anothee event in which she took part was the Japan Grand Prix, the promotion's greatest yearly tournament, in which she made her first appearance at the 1997 edition where she scored a total of five known points against Kaoru Ito, Manami Toyota, Kumiko Maekawa, Etsuko Mita, Mima Shimoda, Tomoko Watanabe, Rie Tamada, Saya Endo, Tanny Mouse, Yoshiko Tamura and Mariko Yoshida. Her last appearance took place at the 2004 edition where she defeated Nanae Takahashi in the first rounds but fell short to Hikaru in the second ones.

Championships and accomplishments
Big Japan Pro Wrestling
BJW Women's Championship (1 time, inaugural)
DDT Pro-Wrestling
Ironman Heavymetalweight Championship (5 times)
JWP Joshi Puroresu
JWP Tag Team Championship (1 time) – with Ran Yu-Yu
NEO Japan Ladies Pro-Wrestling
NWA Women's Pacific/NEO Single Championship (3 times)
NEO Tag Team Championship (2 times) – with Yoshiko Tamura (1) and Haruka Matsuo (1)
AWF World Women's Championship (1 time)
NEO Japan Cup (2001, 2002, 2005)
NEO Hall Of Fame (2010)

References

1973 births
Living people
Japanese female professional wrestlers
21st-century professional wrestlers
People from Saitama Prefecture
Sportspeople from Saitama Prefecture
Ironman Heavymetalweight Champions